Kristoffersson Motorsport is a Swedish auto racing team owned by racing driver Tommy Kristoffersson. It currently competes in the FIA World Rallycross Championship and Swedish Touring Car Championship, with Tommy's son Johan Kristoffersson as one of the drivers. The team has raced under several sponsored names, such as Team Biogas.se, Volkswagen Dealer Team KMS, Volkswagen Team Sweden, Volkswagen RX Sweden and PSRX Volkswagen Sweden.

Rallycross

Tommy Kristoffersson competed with a self-run Audis at the Swedish Rallycross Championship and the FIA European Rallycross Championship (ERX) in the 1980s and 1990s. He won the Swedish championship in 1989, 1991 and 1992, whereas he placed third in the 1993 ERX and fourth in 1991.

In 2013, Johan Kristoffersson and Pontus Tidemand entered the Swedish round of the 2013 FIA European Rallycross Championship with a Volkswagen Scirocco.

In 2014, Kristoffersson drove a Volkswagen Polo at three rounds of the ERX, winning a race, as well as and four rounds of the FIA World Rallycross Championship (WRX). In addition, Ole Christian Veiby entered two WRX rounds and one ERX round.

In 2015, Volkswagen Team Sweden was one of two teams officially supported by Volkswagen Motorsport in the WRX along with Marklund Motorsport. Johan Kristoffersson finished third, and Tord Linnerud finished 14th. Ole Christian Veiby finished third in the 2015 ERX, and entered one WRX round.

Kristoffersson and Marklund combined their operations to participate in the 2016 WRX Championship under the brand Volkswagen RX Sweden. Johan Kristoffersson was runner-up, whereas Anton Marklund finished 13th.

Kristoffersson signed a partnership with the squad of Petter Solberg for the 2017 WRX season, under the name PSRX Volkswagen World RX Team Sweden and is currently headquartered in Torsby. Kristoffersson took six wins and the title, whereas Solberg finished third with one win and three podiums.

STCC

Kristoffersson joined the Swedish Touring Car Championship in 1998, with Tommy Kristoffersson ranking fourth and Mats Lindén fifth with an Audi A4 Quattro. Mattias Ekström won the 1999 title, whereas Kristoffersson finished 9th. In 2000, Fredrik Ekblom was runner-up and Kristoffersson was 8th. Roberto Colciago was the 2001 champion, while Kristoffersson resulted fourth. Colciago defended his title in 2002, Kristoffersson finished 6th and Marius Erlandsen finished 10th.

With the new Audi A4 for the 2003 season, Fredrik Ekblom won the third consecutive title for the team, Tobias Johansson ended 6th and Kristoffersson 7th. In 2004, Ekblom finished third and Kristoffersson 8th. Ekblom ended 6th in 2005 and Kristoffersson 10th. In 2006, Thed Björk won the championship, Ekblom finished 4th and Kristoffersson finished 10th. in 2007, Björk finished 4th, Frank Stippler was 7th and Kristoffersson 14th.

In 2008, Audi dropped factory support to the team. Kristoffersson missed three races and finished 14th, whereas Alexander Lvov finished 19th.

For the 2009 STCC season, Tommy Kristoffersson retired as Johan Kristoffersson replaced him to become the team's new lead driver. Driving an Audi A4, he finished 18th overall and runner-up in the privateers cup, whereas Andreas Simonsen entered two rounds.

In 2010, the Kristoffersson began to operate the Team Biogas.se team, replacing Brovallen Motorsport, switching to Volkswagen Scirocco cars. Ekblom finished third and Patrik Olsson finished sixth, whereas Johan Kristoffersson entered the last three rounds. In 2011, Ekblom was runner-up and Olsson was ninth. Kristoffersson competed in the second half of the season, finishing 10th.

Kristoffersson Motorsport stayed loyal to the STCC in 2012, while rival teams created the TTA – Racing Elite League. Johan Kristoffersson won the championship with the Volkswagen Scirocco, whereas Jordi Gené finished 7th. When both championships merged in 2013 and adopted TTA technical regulations, Kristoffersson decided to close their touring car program.

With Volkswagen Sweden factory support, Kristoffersson Motorsport returned to the STCC in 2017 with the Volkswagen Golf GTI TCR. Fredrik Ekblom was runner-up and Fredrik Blomstedt finished third, whereas Johan Kristoffersson ranked fourth despite entering only four of the seven rounds.

Johan Kristoffersson won the 2018 championship with three wins and seven podiums in 12 races. His teammates Hugo Nerman and Nicklas Oscarsson finished 9th and 15th with no podiums.

Racing record

FIA European Rallycross Championship results
(key)

Supercar

Complete FIA World Rallycross Championship results

(key)

Supercar

* Season still in progress.

References

External links

 

Swedish auto racing teams
World Rallycross Championship teams
Auto racing teams established in 2013
Volkswagen in motorsport
World Rally Championship teams